Amblystegium is a genus of moss belonging to the family Amblystegiaceae.

The genus was described in 1853 by Wilhelm Philippe Schimper.

The genus has cosmopolitan distribution.

Species:
 Amblyaspis belus
 Amblyaspis prorsa
 Amblyaspis roboris
 Amblyaspis scelionoides
 Amblystegium serpens
 Amblyaspis tritici

References

Hypnales
Moss genera